Hen commonly refers to a female animal: a female chicken, other gallinaceous bird, any type of bird in general, or a lobster. It is also a slang term for a woman.

Hen or Hens may also refer to:

Places

Norway
Hen, Buskerud, a village in Ringerike municipality
Hen, Møre og Romsdal, a former municipality now in Rauma municipality
Hen Church

United Kingdom
Hazel Brook or Hen, a stream in Bristol, England
Hen Cliff, on the Isle of Purbeck, Dorset, England
HEN, station code for Hendon railway station, England

Worldwide
 Hen Island (disambiguation)
 Hen and Chicken Islands, New Zealand
 Henan, a province of China (Guobiao abbreviation HEN)

People
 Hen (name), a given name and surname
 Hen (pronoun), a Swedish gender-neutral pronoun
 Hen., an abbreviation of the given name Henry

Other
 Symphony No. 83 (Haydn), nicknamed "The Hen"
 Hen (manga), a 1988 manga created by Hiroya Oku
 HEN, UCI team code for 
 HEN, abbreviation for Hallmark Entertainment Network

See also
 Hehn and Henn
 Henpecked
 Rooster, a male chicken or related bird